1994 Nagoya Grampus Eight season

Review and events

League results summary

League results by round

Competitions

Domestic results

J.League

Suntory series

NICOS series

Emperor's Cup

J.League Cup

Player statistics

 † player(s) joined the team after the opening of this season.

Transfers

In:

Out:

Transfers during the season

In
 Takafumi Ogura (loan return from Excelsior)
 Hiromasa Yamaguchi (from Chukyo University)
 Dragan Stojković (from Olympique de Marseille on July)
 Dragiša Binić (from APOEL F.C. on July)

Out
Tetsuya Asano (loan to Urawa Red Diamonds on April)
Elivélton (on September)

Awards
none

Notes

References

Other pages
 J. League official site
 Nagoya Grampus official site

Nagoya Grampus Eight
Nagoya Grampus seasons